Lisa Jean Moore (born January 2, 1967) is SUNY Distinguished Professor of Sociology and Gender Studies at the State University of New York, Purchase College.  She was born in New York State, received a BA from Tufts University, a Masters of Public Health from the University of California, Berkeley and a PhD from the University of California, San Francisco. After receiving her doctoral degree in 1995, Moore was a fellow in the National Institutes of Mental Health, Traineeship in AIDS Prevention Sciences at the Center for AIDS Prevention Studies, the largest research center in the world dedicated to social, behavioral and policy science approaches to HIV.  She lives in Crown Heights, Brooklyn with her family.

Research 

Moore is a qualitative, medical sociologist with expertise in science and technology studies, gender and sexuality studies, critical body studies and animal studies. She has published nine books and several articles in wide-ranging journals such as Social Text, Hypatia, Ethnography, and Science, Technology and Human Values.

Our Transgenic Future: Spider Goats, Genetic Modification and the Will to Change Nature  centers the story on goats that have been engineered by the US military and civilian scientists using the DNA of spiders. The goat’s milk contains a spider-silk protein fiber; it can be spun into ultra-strong fabric that can be used to manufacture lightweight military body armor. Researchers also hope the transgenically produced spider silk will revolutionize medicine with biocompatible medical inserts such as prosthetics and bandages. 

Catch and Release: The Enduring yet Vulnerable Horseshoe Crab  (NYU Press) explores how humans literally harvest the life out of the horseshoe crabs. We use them as markers for understanding geologic time, collect them for agricultural fertilizer, and eat them as delicacies, capture them as bait, then rescue them for conservation,  and categorize them as endangered.

Buzz: Urban Beekeeping and the Power of the Bee (NYU Press) is based on a collaborative multi-sited ethnography of urban beekeepers in the NYC area. This work with sociologist Mary Kosut investigates the socio-cultural relationship between humans and bees, focusing on how bees become meaningful to human life, and how humans have created conditions of their necessity to bees’ survival.  This book won the 2014 Distinguished Scholarship Award from the American Sociological Association's Animals and Society Section.

In 2007, she published Sperm Counts: Overcome by Man’s Most Precious Fluid (NYU Press) a qualitative research project which analyzes historical documentation of biomedical and contemporary representations from reproductive scientists, semen banking promotional materials on the Internet, children’s "facts of life" books, pornography, forensics transcripts, and sex workers’ narratives, and participant observation.

Her collaborative book with Monica J. Casper entitled Missing Bodies: The Politics of Visibility (NYU Press) draws on varied approaches to examine six provocative sites where some human bodies are highly visible while others are not represented at all, with important consequences for social action and policy. The book calls for a new, systemic, and politically engaged “ocular ethics,” one grounded not merely in representations but also in analysis of social structures.

With Judith Lorber, Moore has written two books. Gendered Bodies: Feminist Perspectives (Oxford University Press) offers a feminist interpretation of prenatal to after-death gendered bodies, men’s as well as women’s, of different abilities, racial ethnic identities, ages, sexualities, and social classes. Gender and the Social Construction of Illness (Altamira Press) considers the interface between the social institutions of gender and Western medicine and offers a distinct feminist viewpoint to analyze issues of power and politics concerning physical illness.

The edited collection The Body Reader: Essential Social and Cultural Readings, a collaborative effort with Mary Kosut, charts the field of the “sociology of the body” by establishing a collection of well-known (tried and true) writing combined with original essays solicited to address particular theoretical and conceptual needs.

In 2014, the textbook The Body: Social and Cultural Dissections, written with Monica J. Casper, offers a comprehensive and accessible overview of sociological and cultural perspectives on the human body. Organized along the lines of a standard anatomical textbook delineated by body parts and processes, this volume subverts the expected content in favor of providing tools for social and cultural analysis.

Book Series 

Moore is the co-founder and co-editor, with Monica Casper, of the book series for NYU Press titled Biopolitics: Medicine, Technoscience, and Health in the 21st Century.  Authors in the series include Thomas Lemke, Janet Shim, Carrie Friese, Joan Wolf, and Cassandra Crawford.

Community service 

From 1993 – 1998, Moore was the board president for The Sperm Bank of California in Berkeley California.

She was also on the board of the Center for Lesbian and Gay Studies at The Graduate Center, CUNY from 2000-2006.

References

External links 

 Purchase College
 Biopolitics Book Series NYU Press
 Lisa Jean Moore on Academia.edu
 Lisa Jean Moore on Amazon.com
 The Sperm Bank of California

1967 births
Living people
Gender studies academics
American sociologists
American women sociologists